The canton of Lapalisse is an administrative division of the Allier department, in central France. At the French canton reorganisation which came into effect in March 2015, it was expanded from 15 to 31 communes. Its seat is in Lapalisse.

It consists of the following communes: 
 
Andelaroche 
Arfeuilles
Arronnes
Barrais-Bussolles
Billezois
Le Breuil
Busset
La Chabanne
La Chapelle
Châtel-Montagne
Châtelus
Droiturier
Ferrières-sur-Sichon
La Guillermie
Isserpent
Lapalisse
Laprugne 
Lavoine
Mariol
Le Mayet-de-Montagne
Molles
Nizerolles
Périgny
Saint-Christophe
Saint-Clément
Saint-Étienne-de-Vicq
Saint-Nicolas-des-Biefs
Saint-Pierre-Laval
Saint-Prix
Servilly
Le Vernet

References

Cantons of Allier